USS Houston (CL-81) was a  light cruiser of the United States Navy, which were built during World War II. The class was designed as a development of the earlier s, the size of which had been limited by the First London Naval Treaty. The start of the war led to the dissolution of the treaty system, but the dramatic need for new vessels precluded a new design, so the Clevelands used the same hull as their predecessors, but were significantly heavier. The Clevelands carried a main battery of twelve  guns in four three-gun turrets, along with a secondary armament of twelve  dual-purpose guns.

She was active in the Pacific War and survived two separate aerial torpedo hits in October 1944.

Design

Following the start of World War II in September 1939, Britain announced it would suspend the treaty for the duration of the conflict, a decision the US Navy quickly followed. Though still neutral, the United States recognized that war was likely and the urgent need for additional ships ruled out an entirely new design, so the Clevelands were a close development of the earlier s, the chief difference being the substitution of a two-gun  dual-purpose gun mount for one of the main battery  gun turrets.

The ship was powered by four General Electric steam turbines, each driving one propeller shaft, using steam provided by four oil-fired Babcock & Wilcox boilers. Her crew numbered 1285 officers and enlisted men.

The ship was armed with a main battery of twelve 6 in /47 caliber Mark 16 guns in four 3-gun turrets on the centerline. Two were placed forward in a superfiring pair; the other two turrets were placed aft of the superstructure in another superfiring pair. The secondary battery consisted of twelve  /38 caliber dual-purpose guns mounted in twin turrets. Two of these were placed on the centerline, one directly behind the forward main turrets and the other just forward of the aft turrets. Two more were placed abreast of the conning tower and the other pair on either side of the aft superstructure. Anti-aircraft defense consisted of twenty-four Bofors  guns in four quadruple and four double mounts and twenty-one Oerlikon  guns in single mounts.

The main battery turrets were protected with  faces and  sides and tops, and they were supported by barbettes 6 inches thick. Houstons conning tower had 5-inch sides.

Service history
Houston was laid down at the Newport News Shipbuilding & Dry Dock Company at Newport News, Virginia on 4 August 1941, originally under the name Vicksburg. On 12 October 1942, she was renamed Houston; some five months before, on 30 May, 1,000 Navy recruits, known as the Houston Volunteers, were sworn in at a dedication ceremony in downtown Houston but with a nineteen-month period between then and commissioning, only one served aboard the new Houston. and the completed hull was launched on 19 June 1943. Fitting-out work was completed by December that year, and she was commissioned on the 20th. Captain William W. Behrens Sr. served as the ship's first commander. The ship got underway on 1 February 1944 to begin her shakedown cruise. She initially sailed to the Caribbean Sea, and then returned north for initial training off Boston. On 16 April, she left for the Pacific Ocean to join the war effort there. She passed through the Panama Canal and sailed north to San Diego, before continuing on to Pearl Harbor. She arrived there on 6 May and carried out further training exercises for the next few weeks.

World War II operations
Houston departed from Hawaii later in May and arrived in Majuro Atoll on the 31st, where she joined the anti-aircraft screen for the aircraft carriers of the Fast Carrier Task Force, then part of the Fifth Fleet. She and the rest of the fleet then began the invasion of the Mariana and Palau Islands. The fleet got underway on 5 June and began air strikes on the islands on 12 June to prepare for the amphibious invasion, which started with the invasion of Saipan on 15 June. For their part, the Japanese launched their counter-attack with the recently formed 1st Mobile Fleet. In the resulting Battle of the Philippine Sea on 19 June, Houston contributed her anti-aircraft guns to the fleet's defense. After American air strikes on the 1st Mobile Fleet sank two of the Japanese carriers, the Japanese withdrew, allowing the American fleet to return to operations in support of the Marianas campaign. On 26 June, Houston joined the shore bombardment unit that targeted Guam and Rota. During the bombardment, she destroyed ten aircraft, the airstrip they occupied, and a radar installation. Houston thereafter sailed for Eniwetok to replenish ammunition for the next operation.

By this time, the Fast Carrier Task Force had passed to the command of the Third Fleet, and all of the units were renumbered. The task force departed on 30 August to begin air strikes on the Palau Islands to prepare for the upcoming invasion of Peleliu. The carriers struck the islands on 6 September, after which Houston and several destroyers bombarded Peleliu and other islands in the area. The Fast Carrier Task Force then sailed west to neutralize Japanese airfields in the Philippines before returning for another series of attacks on Peleliu from 17 to 19 September to support American ground forces that had landed on the island on the 15th. The fleet then departed for Ulithi atoll to prepare for the next offensive, arriving there on 1 October.

Formosa raid and torpedoing

On 6 October, the Fast Carrier Task Force sortied to carry out a series of air strikes on Japanese targets in the western Pacific. These began with attacks on Okinawa on 10 October, followed by attacks on Formosa two days later. The Formosa Air Battle lasted for three days, and American forces inflicted serious damage to the Japanese 2nd Air Fleet based on the island. Houstons anti-aircraft gunners claimed four aircraft shot down on 12 October, and three more on 14 October. During the latter engagement late in the day, a Japanese torpedo bomber hit Houston with a torpedo in one of her engine rooms. The hole flooded all four machinery spaces, which disabled power aboard the ship. The ship's damage control teams began work immediately and began efforts to control flooding; eventually, they were able to contain flooding and pump some undamaged compartments empty.

The heavy cruiser  took Houston under tow to evacuate the crippled vessel, though the tugboat  had taken over the towline later that night. As the ship could no longer feed or house her crew due to the damage, most of the men were evacuated save the captain and damage control teams. She and the heavy cruiser , which had also been disabled by a torpedo hit, came under heavy attack from the 2nd Air Fleet on 16 October, and Houston was struck by a second torpedo in the stern, directly above her rudder. The explosion set fire to the starboard tank that held fuel for the ship's reconnaissance floatplanes, causing a major fire in the aircraft hanger, though the remaining crew suppressed the blaze within fifteen minutes. Flooding from this hit degraded the ship's buoyancy and stability further. Another 300 men were evacuated afterward, leaving just 200 aboard to continue damage control efforts as the ships withdrew.

The Japanese believed the withdrawing formation might be intercepted, and sortied from the Inland Sea in an attempt to sink them, but an American air attack forced them to withdraw. Houston and Canberra had arrived back at Ulithi by 27 October; there, Houston underwent temporary repairs with assistance from the repair ship . There were no floating dry docks large enough to accommodate Houston, but significant hull repairs were nevertheless effected and much of the flooding was pumped out. This work allowed her to steam to Manus Island for further work, arriving there on 20 December. There, the floating dry dock  took the cruiser aboard, allowing the rest of the hull damage to be plated over and the remaining water pumped out. Two of her boilers were also restored to operation, along with the No. 2 and 3 engines, allowing her to get underway in February. From there, she sailed to the New York Navy Yard for permanent repairs, which she reached on 24 March 1945. Work lasted until 11 October, by which time the war had ended with the surrender of Japan. In the course of the ship's wartime service, Houston received three battle stars.

Post-War service

After returning to active service, Houston conducted refresher training for her crew in the Caribbean. She then joined training maneuvers held off Newport, Rhode Island. On 16 April 1946, she embarked on a goodwill cruise to visit European ports, including cities in Scandinavia, Portugal, and Italy; she also stopped in Egypt while cruising the Mediterranean Sea. Houston arrived back in the United States on 14 December and thereafter took part in various training exercises through 17 May 1947. At that time, she joined Cruiser Division 12 for another voyage to the Mediterranean. She returned to Philadelphia on 16 August, and was decommissioned on 15 December. She was allocated to the reserve fleet, remaining in the Navy's inventory until 1 March 1959, when she was stricken from the Naval Vessel Register and sold to be broken up.

Footnotes

Notes

Citations

References

Further reading

External links

hazegray.org: USS Houston
Biography of Houston's first CO
Official report on torpedo damage off Formosa, 14 and 16 October 1944

 

Cleveland-class cruisers
World War II cruisers of the United States
1943 ships
Ships built in Newport News, Virginia